Gerardo Suero (born 24 August 1957) is a Dominican Republic sprinter. He competed in the men's 100 metres at the 1980 Summer Olympics.

References

1957 births
Living people
Athletes (track and field) at the 1980 Summer Olympics
Dominican Republic male sprinters
Olympic athletes of the Dominican Republic
Central American and Caribbean Games bronze medalists for the Dominican Republic
Athletes (track and field) at the 1979 Pan American Games
Athletes (track and field) at the 1987 Pan American Games
Competitors at the 1982 Central American and Caribbean Games
Competitors at the 1986 Central American and Caribbean Games
Place of birth missing (living people)
Central American and Caribbean Games medalists in athletics
Pan American Games competitors for the Dominican Republic